Solomon Duah (born 7 January 1993) is a Finnish football player, who currently plays for TPS

He also holds Ghanaian citizenship.

References

External links
 
  
  

1993 births
Living people
Finnish footballers
Finland youth international footballers
Finland under-21 international footballers
FC Inter Turku players
Turun Toverit players
Kuopion Palloseura players
Levanger FK players
Turun Palloseura footballers
Veikkausliiga players
Kakkonen players
Norwegian First Division players
Ykkönen players
Finnish people of Ghanaian descent
Association football midfielders
People from Kitee
Sportspeople from North Karelia